Flight from the Millions (Danish:Flugten fra millionerne) is a 1934 Danish comedy film directed by Pál Fejös and starring Inga Arvad, Erling Schroeder and Tudlik Johansen. It was one of three films made in Denmark by the Hungarian director Fejös along with Prisoner Number One and The Golden Smile. It was made by Nordisk Film, the largest Danish studio. The film's sets were designed by the art director Heinz Fenchel.

Cast
 Inga Arvad as Lilian  
 Erling Schroeder as John  
 Tudlik Johansen as Anna  
 Christian Arhoff as Kammertjener James  
 Johannes Meyer as Præsident for Papegøjesamfundet  
 Kai Holm as Matros  
 Rasmus Christiansen as Onkel  
 Peter Nielsen as Onkel  
 Aage Foss as Onkel  
 Regnar Bjelke as Onkel  
 Maria Garland as Tante  
 Agnes Rehni as Tante  
 Mary Alice Therp as Tante  
 Ingeborg Pehrson as Tante  
 Albrecht Schmidt as Notar  
 Knud Heglund as Overtjener

References

Bibliography 
 Cunningham, John. Hungarian Cinema: From Coffee House to Multiplex. Wallflower Press, 2004. 
 Georges Sadoul & Peter Morris. Dictionary of Film Makers. University of California Press, 1972.

External links 
 

1934 films
Danish comedy films
1934 comedy films
1930s Danish-language films
Films directed by Paul Fejos
Danish black-and-white films